Rafael Euclides Soares Camacho (born 22 May 2000) is a Portuguese professional footballer who plays as a winger for Super League Greece club Aris, on loan from Sporting CP.

Club career

Liverpool 
Born in Lisbon of Angolan descent, Camacho joined Liverpool’s academy from Sporting CP at the end of the 2015–16 season following a successful trial. He is a versatile player who can play anywhere across the front line but had also featured at right back and wing back.

Camacho was named on the substitutes' bench for the Merseyside Derby against Everton in the Premier League on 7 April 2018 as a late injury replacement for Alberto Moreno but did not make an appearance. In December 2018 he was named on the bench for games against Burnley and Manchester United. He made his senior debut in the FA Cup third round against Wolverhampton Wanderers on 7 January 2019, and his league debut 12 days later, coming on as a late substitute in a 4–3 win over Crystal Palace.

Sporting CP 
On 27 June 2019, Camacho rejoined Sporting CP on a five-year contract for a reported fee of £7 million.

On 1 February 2021, Camacho agreed to a loan move to Rio Ave for the remainder of the season.

On 12 July 2022, he joined Aris on a season-long loan.

Career statistics

Club

References

2000 births
Living people
Portuguese sportspeople of Angolan descent
Portuguese footballers
Manchester City F.C. players
Liverpool F.C. players
Sporting CP footballers
Sporting CP B players
Rio Ave F.C. players
Belenenses SAD players
Aris Thessaloniki F.C. players
Association football wingers
Expatriate footballers in England
Portuguese expatriate sportspeople in England
Portuguese expatriate sportspeople in Greece
Portuguese expatriate footballers
Footballers from Lisbon
Premier League players
Primeira Liga players
Super League Greece players
Campeonato de Portugal (league) players
Portugal youth international footballers